Coulston Glacier is a small tributary glacier flowing south from the Cartographers Range into Trafalgar Glacier,  west of Bypass Hill, in the Victory Mountains of Victoria Land. It was mapped by the United States Geological Survey from surveys and from U.S. Navy air photos 1960–64, and named by the Advisory Committee on Antarctic Names for Peter W. Coulston, an aviation electronics technician with U.S. Navy Squadron VX-6 at McMurdo Station, 1967.

See also
 List of glaciers in the Antarctic
 Glaciology

References 

Glaciers of Borchgrevink Coast